The Toronto Rock are a lacrosse team based in Toronto playing in the National Lacrosse League (NLL). The 2018 season is the 21st in franchise history, and 20th as the Rock.

Regular season

Finalstandings

Game log

Regular season

Roster

Entry Draft
The 2017 NLL Entry Draft took place on September 18, 2017. The Rock made the following selections:

See also
2018 NLL season

References

Toronto
Toronto Rock
2018 in Canadian sports